Montrose is a small city in Wright County, Minnesota, United States. Montrose is surrounded by farmland, prairies, and lakes. The population was 2,847 at the 2010 census.

History
Montrose was platted in 1878, and named after Montrose, in Scotland. Montrose was incorporated in 1881.  The Dr. E.P. Hawkins Clinic, Hospital, and House, an early-20th-century medical complex, is listed on the National Register of Historic Places.

Geography
U.S. Highway 12 and Minnesota State Highway 25 are two of the main routes in the community.

Nearby places include Delano, Buffalo, Hanover, Rockford, Waverly, and Watertown.

Demographics

2010 census
As of the census of 2010, there were 2,847 people, 1,043 households, and 734 families living in the city. The racial makeup of the city was 95.2% White, 0.6% African American, 0.2% Native American, 0.9% Asian, 1.2% from other races, and 1.9% from two or more races. Hispanic or Latino of any race were 3.0% of the population.

There were 1,043 households, of which 46.1% had children under the age of 18 living with them, 54.6% were married couples living together, 9.2% had a female householder with no husband present, 6.6% had a male householder with no wife present, and 29.6% were non-families. 22.1% of all households were made up of individuals, and 4.8% had someone living alone who was 65 years of age or older. The average household size was 2.73 and the average family size was 3.23.

The median age in the city was 29.5 years. 31.9% of residents were under the age of 18; 7% were between the ages of 18 and 24; 40.2% were from 25 to 44; 15.4% were from 45 to 64; and 5.4% were 65 years of age or older. The gender makeup of the city was 50.2% male and 49.8% female.

2000 census
As of the census of 2000, there were 1,143 people, 454 households, and 281 families living in the city. The racial makeup of the city was 97.20% White, 0.70% African American, 0.17% Asian, 1.31% from other races, and 0.61% from two or more races. Hispanic or Latino of any race were 1.31% of the population.

There were 454 households, out of which 36.6% had children under the age of 18 living with them, 51.1% were married couples living together, 6.8% had a female householder with no husband present, and 37.9% were non-families. 30.8% of all households were made up of individuals, and 7.3% had someone living alone who was 65 years of age or older.  The average household size was 2.52 and the average family size was 3.18.

In the city, the population was spread out, with 28.7% under the age of 18, 11.6% from 18 to 24, 34.1% from 25 to 44, 17.7% from 45 to 64, and 7.9% who were 65 years of age or older.  The median age was 30 years. For every 100 females, there were 107.4 males.  For every 100 females age 18 and over, there were 107.9 males.

The median income for a household in the city was $39,583, and the median income for a family was $52,833. Males had a median income of $31,434 versus $26,481 for females. The per capita income for the city was $19,281.  About 4.6% of families and 6.4% of the population were below the poverty line, including 6.1% of those under age 18 and 4.0% of those age 65 or over.

Politics

References

External links 
 City Website

Cities in Minnesota
Cities in Wright County, Minnesota